Thomas Chabrol (born 24 April 1963) is a French actor, director and screenwriter.

Filmography

On stage

References

External links

1963 births
20th-century French male actors
21st-century French male actors
French male film actors
French male screenwriters
French male television actors
French screenwriters
French television directors
Living people